The Besokatra River is located in northern Madagascar.  Its sources are situated near Joffreville in the Amber Mountain National Park, in the Ambohitra Massif, it crosses the Route nationale 6 near Mahavanona and flows into the Indian Ocean.

References 

Rivers of Diana Region
Rivers of Madagascar